Maria Helene Françoise Izabel Gräfin von Maltzan, Freiin zu Wartenberg und Penzlin (25 March 1909 – 12 November 1997) was an aristocrat who, as part of the German Resistance against Adolf Hitler and the Nazi party, saved the lives of many Jewish people in Berlin.

Biography
Countess Maria von Maltzan was born into a wealthy noble family at Militsch Palace, Silesia, Germany (today Milicz, Poland) and was raised on the family's  estate, the youngest of eight children. After completing grade school in Berlin in 1927, she decided to undertake studies in zoology at the University of Breslau, a rare occurrence for a girl during this time. Her family was strictly against the idea, but her teachers supported her and she got permission. In 1928, she enrolled at the University of Munich where she received her doctorate in natural sciences five years later.

When the Nazis seized power in 1933, her sense of justice made her join different resistance movements against the Nazis almost immediately. For years, she worked as an underground-fighter. Due to her status and relation to numerous Nazi officers, von Maltzan was at first above suspicion. Maria von Maltzan's sister Alix was married to Field Marshal Walther von Reichenau. As the brutality of the Nazi Régime accelerated with murder, violence and terror, the seeds of their plan for the total extermination of the Jews dawned on Maria von Maltzan in all its horror - and she immediately decided to act. Back in Berlin since 1935, she always responded to calls for help and took the Jews into her own home, fed and protected them, right under the noses of the Gestapo. Due to her well-known political attitude, she had to get by with numerous jobs before she began studying veterinary medicine in 1940, graduating in 1943. Throughout the war, the Countess von Maltzan, in cooperation with the Swedish Church, provided a safe haven for more than 60 Jews, deserters, and forced labourers, arranging for them to escape to safety. She falsified official visas and other documents, and helped many Jews escape from Berlin in trucks that she often drove herself.

Before World War II, she got to know the Jewish author Hans Hirschel, the former editor of Das Dreieck, an avant-garde German literary journal founded in 1925. From 1942 to the end of the war, she sheltered Hirschel in a special hiding place inside a couch in the living room of her apartment in Wilmersdorf, thus saving his life at the peril of her own. Von Maltzan became pregnant with Hans's child. She later recalled how the new-born baby was placed in an incubator and the hospital was bombed. The electricity running the incubator stopped and the baby died. Shortly afterwards, she adopted two little girls from a children's camp.

After the war von Maltzan married Hans Hirschel but the marriage failed. They separated after two years, then remarried in 1972. During the post-war-years, Maria had many difficulties, but grateful Jews, who never forgot her heroism, helped her survive bitter years. Because of the horrors of the war, she became addicted to drugs and at times lost her approbation as a veterinarian. She later recalled how she was even brought to a psychiatric hospital, and had to scrub floors day after day to afford a living.

Post-war life and legacy 

After Hans Hirschel died in 1975, Countess Maria von Maltzan, aged 66, decided once again to build up a new existence with her own veterinary practice in Berlin, from 1981 on located in the Kreuzberg district, where she became famous for the cost-free treatment of dogs owned by local punks and her struggle for improvement of the living conditions of immigrants. In 1986, she published her autobiography titled  Beat the Drums and Be Without Fright, which made her life and work known to a wider public. She was granted the Righteous among the Nations award from the Israeli Government one year later. She died in Berlin in 1997.

Stage and Screen
Forbidden, a 1984 film by Anthony Page modeled on the life of Maria von Maltzan, played by Jacqueline Bisset.
Maria von Maltzan: A Play in Two Acts, a 2021 play by Australian playwright, David Logan, based on the life of Maria von Maltzan

Additional information
German Resistance
Walther von Reichenau

Notes

External links
Short Biography and pictures
Short biographical note
Biography 
Maria von Maltzan – her activity to save Jews' lives during the Holocaust, at Yad Vashem website
Oral history interview with Maria Grafin von Maltzan, 1988 July 29, United States Holocaust Memorial Museum

1909 births
1997 deaths
Maria
People from Milicz
People from the Province of Silesia
Silesian nobility
German baronesses
German countesses
German Protestants
20th-century German people
German resistance members
Female resistance members of World War II
German Righteous Among the Nations
Protestant Righteous Among the Nations